The 1980 Coppa Italia Final was the final of the 1979–80 Coppa Italia. The match was played on 17 May 1980 between Roma and Torino. Roma won 3–2 on penalties after a 0–0 draw after extra time.

Match

References 
Coppa Italia 1979/80 statistics at rsssf.com
 https://www.calcio.com/calendario/ita-coppa-italia-1979-1980-finale/2/
 https://www.worldfootball.net/schedule/ita-coppa-italia-1979-1980-finale/2/

Coppa Italia Finals
Coppa Italia Final 1980
Coppa Italia Final 1980
Coppa Italia Final 1980